Elias Mann (May 8, 1750 in  Weymouth, Massachusetts – May 12, 1825 in Northampton) was one of the first American composers. He was one of the men responsible for founding the Massachusetts Musical Society

Scores
Volume 4. Elias Mann (1750-1825), The Collected Works, edited by Daniel Jones. 192 pages,

References

1750 births
1825 deaths
American male composers
American composers
People from Weymouth, Massachusetts